Rudebox is the seventh studio album by English singer-songwriter Robbie Williams, released on 23 October 2006 in the United Kingdom. It features two guest appearances from the Pet Shop Boys. The album was produced by a variety of producers including: Mark Ronson, Soul Mekanik, Pet Shop Boys and Jerry Meehan.

Musically, Rudebox is a dance album with pop, disco, electronica and rap elements.

Rudebox was supported by five singles: "Rudebox", "Kiss Me", "Lovelight", "Bongo Bong and Je ne t'aime plus" and "She's Madonna". The title track was a big success in Europe, reaching number one in Germany, Switzerland and Italy. It also reached the top ten in a lot of other countries around the world.

"Lovelight" was a top ten hit in six countries, including the UK, where it peaked at number 8.

Background 
The album features collaborations with William Orbit, Mark Ronson, Soul Mekanik (featuring Candy Flip's Danny Spencer and his brother) and two collaborations with Pet Shop Boys: "She's Madonna" and "We're the Pet Shop Boys". Lily Allen provides backing vocals on the songs "Bongo Bong and Je ne t'aime plus" and "Keep On". Williams covers five songs on the album: "Louise", a 1984 hit for The Human League, "Kiss Me", the biggest hit for Stephen Duffy, "Lovelight" by Lewis Taylor, "We're the Pet Shop Boys" by My Robot Friend, and "Bongo Bong and Je ne t'aime plus", by Manu Chao.

Williams himself spoke fondly of the album upon its release; "It has become something on which I've found myself. This is the right direction for me personally, this is what it is. I saw the whole Robbie thing coming to a close as it was, I couldn't make another album like the ones I'd made, and this has just opened up a thousand other doors. What I am excited about now is making more music. I love all the stuff on the album, I love Rudebox, it's a favourite song of mine. I don't know what's gonna happen now, I'm excited about getting it out there, but I'm more excited about making more."

The album is a mixture of covers and new tracks, in addition to "Summertime", a song originally written when Williams left Take That and which appeared in the credits of Mike Bassett: England Manager. Receiving a mixed reception from critics, the album reached the top position in fourteen countries including United Kingdom, Australia, Switzerland, Germany, Mexico, Argentina, Spain, Italy and Finland.

Controversies
"She's Madonna" was the centre of a tabloid storm after Ashley Hamilton claimed that he came up with part of the song with Williams. Hamilton has claimed he wishes to take the matter to court as he is not credited as a co-writer on the album.

Further controversy arose over the track "The 90's", part of which implies that Williams was ripped off by Take That's manager Nigel Martin-Smith after the band failed to make a profit from a European tour. The song raised the ire of Martin-Smith, who demanded that the song be removed from the album. The omitted lyrics were rapped during the break before the second verse. During a 2019 concert at The Roundhouse in London, Williams stated: "Somebody asked me to do The '90s tonight. But I can't [...] because I'll get sued by Nigel Martin-Smith".

Reception

Critical reception

According to review aggregator Metacritic, Rudebox received an average of 53 out of 100 indicating "mixed or average reviews"  from music critics, based on reviews from 12 critics.

Rating the album 8 out of 10, Priya Elan of NME wrote "Luckily, ‘Rudebox’ is the best thing he's ever put his name to", adding that "there's the double-headed autobiography of ‘The 80s’ (currently at the centre of a legal dispute) and its follow-up ‘The 90s’, the clattering ‘Vogue’ rap in the LA tale ‘The Actor’ and ‘She’s Madonna’ – possibly his most bonkers song ever."

Julie Broadfoot of BBC Music wrote "There are a couple of tracks that wash over you but the album's a grower and some of the hooks will follow you around for hours", adding that ""Good Doctor", a tongue-in-cheek take on drugs, has bags of energy and the Stephen Duffy "Kiss Me" is brilliant. 'She's Madonna' ('I love you baby, but face it she's Madonna') is a weird but fun tune about Queen Madge."

Commercial performance
In the United Kingdom, the album sold 54,667 copies on the day of its release, reaching number one on the midweek version of the UK Albums Chart. The next day, the album had sold over 75,000 copies. The album debuted at No. 1 on the UK Albums Chart, selling over 147,000 copies in its week of release. Despite reaching number one, sales were far below what was expected by his label EMI and overall sales were overtaken by his former band Take That's Beautiful World. However, the album performed better than Beautiful World outside the UK. The fallout of the album's relative failure led to the firing of two music executives responsible for the album's development. As of December 2013, the album had sold 514,457 copies in the UK.

The album was released in the Netherlands on 20 October 2006, on the same day the album was certified platinum as a result of pre-order sales of over 70,000 copies. In Belgium, the album sold 50,000 copies and went platinum. It was released on 23 October 2006 in Australia and debuted at number-one, achieving platinum status in its first week. It has since been certified 2× Platinum. 220,000 copies of the album were sold in France on the week of release, as well as 600,000 in Germany. On 8 November 2006, IFPI certified the album 2× Platinum in Europe with sales of over 2 million copies, making it the fastest platinum selling album of 2006. On 20 November 2006, the album reached number-one in Mexico, becoming Williams' first number-one album there. The album was certified platinum there, with sales of over 100,000 copies.

Sequel 
In December 2020, while promoting "Can't Stop Christmas", Williams revealed to the Official Charts Company that he had recorded a dance album during the lockdown period, which includes collaborations with Guy Chambers and a number of dance music artists from Stoke-on-Trent. The untitled album was scheduled to be released in spring 2021, and might be released with the band name Stoke House Mafia (a name inspired by 2010s chart stars Swedish House Mafia), though the report from the Official Charts Company did not confirm whether the record was the Rudebox sequel or not.

Track listing

Notes
 "Rudebox" contains elements of the composition "Boops (Here to Go)" as written by Bill Laswell, Carl Aiken, Bootsy Collins, Sly Dunbar and Robbie Shakespeare.

Charts

Weekly charts

Year-end charts

Certifications and sales

References

External links
 Official web page
 Rudebox details in cosmopolis.ch

2006 albums
Robbie Williams albums
Albums produced by Mark Ronson
Albums produced by William Orbit